Moure is a Portuguese parish, located in the municipality of Barcelos. The population in 2011 was 925, in an area of 2.54 km².

References

Freguesias of Barcelos, Portugal